WLFV (98.9 MHz) is a commercial FM radio station, licensed to Midlothian, Virginia and serving the Greater Richmond Region. The station is branded as "K-Love" and features a Contemporary Christian format. The station is owned by Educational Media Foundation (EMF). WLFV's transmitter is off Basie Road in Henrico, Virginia.

History
WJMA-FM signed on November 22, 1971, on 96.7 MHz from Orange, Virginia. It was co-owned with WJMA (1340 AM, now WVCV). In 2003, the station ended up in the hands of Maniquad Communications, which at the time was the owner of rimshots WBBT-FM in Powhatan and WARV-FM in Petersburg. Maniquad filed to move WJMA-FM to 98.9 FM in Richmond proper, and the station began broadcasting from its new facilities in March 2005.

Prior to becoming K-Love in 2017, WLFV was owned by Alpha Media. The station featured a country music format branded as "The Wolf," and was simulcast on co-owned WARV-FM. On December 5, 2016, EMF filed an application with the FCC to purchase both WLFV and WARV-FM for $2 million.

On March 22, 2017, following the consummation of EMF's purchase, WLFV began stunting, directing listeners to sister station WWLB (the classic country-formatted "Hank FM"). On March 23, 2017, WLFV went silent in advance of its impending flip to K-Love.

WLFV remained off the air for three weeks while EMF repaired a failed satellite dish mount. Finally, on April 14, 2017, WLFV returned to the airwaves as K-Love. Despite the change in ownership and format, the station retained its WLFV call letters.

Previous logo

References

External links

1971 establishments in Virginia
Radio stations established in 1971
Educational Media Foundation radio stations
K-Love radio stations
LFV